Antelope Flat Reservoir is an impoundment located in the southern part of the Maury Mountains in Crook County, Oregon. The western part of the lake is within the Ochoco National Forest. A boat-launch ramp is located at the lake's western end, and a 25-unit campground lies just up the hill from there.

See also
List of lakes in Oregon

References

Lakes of Crook County, Oregon
Ochoco National Forest
Reservoirs in Oregon